Alisha (Arabic: علیشا Romanized: 'Alīshā) is cognate of the female given name Alicia, a variant of Alice, which comes from the Old English name Æthelhādas or Æðelhādas, meaning "noble natured" (noble of kind).

Variant forms used by notable individuals include Alesha, Allysha and Alysha.

Notable people with this name
 Alisha (singer), American singer
 Alisha Boe (born 1997), Norwegian actress
 Alysha Boekhoudt (born 1993), Aruban model
 Alysha Brilla (born 1988), Canadian musician
 Alysha Burnett (born 1997), Australian athlete
 Alisha Butchers (born 1997), Welsh rugby player
 Allysha Chapman (born 1989), Canadian soccer player
 Alisha Chinai (born 1965), Indian pop singer
 Alysha Clark (born 1987), African-American professional basketball player
 Alesha Dixon, English singer
 Alisha Edwards (born 1987), American professional wrestler
 Allisha Gray (born 1995), American basketball player
 Alisha Kramer (born 1990), American physician and health activist
 Alysha Newman (born 1994), Canadian Olympic athlete

See also
 Alicia (given name)
 Elisha (given name)
 Alisha (Alisha Chinai album), 2001
 Alisha's Attic, band

References

English feminine given names
Feminine given names